Wonder Boy in Monster World, known in Japan as Wonder Boy V: Monster World III, is a side-scrolling action role-playing game originally developed by Westone and published by Sega for the Mega Drive/Genesis in 1991. It is the fifth game in the Wonder Boy series and the third game in the Monster World sub-series, following Wonder Boy in Monster Land (Super Wonder Boy: Monster World on the Japanese Sega Mark III) and  Wonder Boy III: The Dragon's Trap (Monster World II: Dragon no Wana on the Japanese Game Gear).

Versions for other platforms were also made. In 2007, the Turbo Duo and Mega Drive versions were re-released on the Wii Virtual Console download service.

Gameplay

Wonder Boy In Monster World puts the player in control of Shion in his quest to save Monster World from the evil BioMeka. It controls like a standard platform game: run, jump, crouch, and kill enemies.  The game is filled with Adventure elements such as talking to townsfolk, collecting money to buy items, extending the life bar by collecting hearts, and equipping a large variety of armor, weapons and magic.

Shion travels through the many interconnected regions of Monster World, all the while collecting increasingly powerful equipment in the form of many different swords, spears, shields, suits of armor, and boots.

The Genesis version of the game introduced a one slot save feature to save progress at inns throughout the game world. In the original Japanese version Shion returned to the inn last saved at upon death (and was charged its fee accordingly), so returning to an inn in order to save is a simple matter of allowing Shion to be killed. In the English-language Mega Drive versions this was changed to a "Game Over" screen; this made it often tedious to return to the inns early in the game when Return magic had not been obtained yet. The Master System version uses a password system.

Plot
In the Genesis and Master System versions, Monster World is described as a once peaceful land. One day, peace was shattered by an invading army of monsters, with seemingly no source for their appearance. The Fairy Queen Eleanora headed to the town of Purapril to seek aide from the Princess after her town of Alsedo was attacked, only to discover that the Princess went missing and many other towns across Monster World have been attacked as well. Eleanora offers up a prayer to the gods that someone, perhaps even a hero, would step forward. Her prayers reach a young man named Shion, who vows to defeat the invading monsters and make Monster World peaceful again.

In the Turbografx-16 release, The Dynastic Hero, Monster World is instead named as the land of Tarron, a woodland that was once known as "the peaceful paradise". One day, the evil Drillkor Empire of reptilian monsters attacked Tarron using their advanced technology and space station. Rippen the Beast, Emperor of the Drillko, attacks Tarron Castle and imprisons the Princess in her own castle dungeon. The princess prays to the gods of Tarron for the aide of a hero. The call to adventure is answered by a young warrior named Dyna, setting out to the fairy village Lindor for information from Queen Nora.

Characters
During his travels, Shion will often be joined by a small companion who follows him around. Each companion is bound to the region they belong to, and will return to their respective homes when Shion leaves said region. All travel companions will also temporarily stay out of action during boss fights.

Other characters

Conversions and ports
The Master System port is somewhat different. It features re-drawn graphics, fewer and shorter stages, and a complex password system (approximately 40 digits in length) rather than battery-backed save data. The Genesis version is included on the North American and European releases of the Sega Genesis Mini microconsole.

Hudson Soft later released a slightly re-branded version for the Turbo Duo titled The Dynastic Hero. It features palette-swapped visuals, new insect-themed graphics for the main characters (and insects' natural predators as bosses), a Red Book audio soundtrack which is completely different from the Wonder Boy original, and anime-style cutscenes at the intro and ending. Shion was renamed Dyna and was modeled after a Hercules beetle, and the final boss was changed to a giant lizard king. An English-language version was also produced, but both were built off of the Japanese version of Wonder Boy in Monster World so they feature the same difficulty and mechanics as the Japanese version. This particular version was released on Nintendo's Virtual Console service in Europe on November 30, 2007, and in North America on December 3, 2007.

Tec Toy, Sega's distributor in Brazil, altered the Mega Drive version and released it as Turma da Mônica na Terra Dos Monstros  (lit.: Monica's Gang in the Monsters' Land). Like other Wonder Boy-to-Monica conversions, the game is in Portuguese, the main character is Monica from the Monica's Gang comics, and other elements and characters from it were added. Following the re-release of the Sega Mega Drive by Tec Toy in Brazil, the Turma da Mônica na Terra Dos Monstros  was also re-released with new boxing, a manual and a label in August 2017.

Adaptation

The UK comic Sonic the Comic ran an 8-part comic strip through issues 2–9 starring Shion on his adventures in Demon World.

Reception

Electronic Gaming Monthly gave the Turbo Duo version a 7.2 out of 10, praising the music, graphics, and vast size of the game. GamePro were less impressed, remarking that the characters "have that doe-eyed look reminiscent of the best motel art" and that figuring out how to use some of the items is difficult. They did praise the game's emphasis on action over dialogue and travel, but concluded, "Still, it appears that the designers didn't work too hard to inject much freshness, like a more intriguing story line or more realistic graphics. That's what makes Dynastic Hero a 'run of the mill' rather than a 'better' RPG."

References

External links

 Wonder Boy in Monster World at Mobygames

Wonder Boy in Monster World can be played for free in the browser on the Internet Archive

1991 video games
Fantasy video games
PlayStation Network games
Sega video games
Master System games
Sega Genesis games
Side-scrolling role-playing video games
TurboGrafx-CD games
Virtual Console games
Wonder Boy (video game series)
Xbox 360 Live Arcade games
Single-player video games
Action-adventure games
Video games developed in Japan
Westone Bit Entertainment games